Domašov nad Bystřicí (formerly Domštát) is a municipality and village in Olomouc District in the Olomouc Region of the Czech Republic. It has about 500 inhabitants.

History

The first written mention of Domašov nad Bystřicí is from 1269.

The Battle of Domstadtl of the Seven Years' War took place near the village in 1758. After the compromise of 1867, along with the Bohemian Crown, it was located in the Austrian part of Austro-Hungary, as Domstadtl, in the Sternberg (Šternberk) district, one of the 34 Bezirkshauptmannschaften in Moravia. Following World War I, since 1918, it was part of Czechoslovakia.

In 1938, after the Munich Agreement, it was occupied by Germany as part of the Reichsgau Sudetenland, one of the 6 towns of County Bärn. During World War II, the Germans operated the E159 forced labour subcamp of the Stalag VIII-B/344 prisoner-of-war camp at the local quarry. The German speaking population was expelled in 1945 according to the Beneš decrees and replaced by Czech settlers, who renamed the village.

References

External links

Villages in Olomouc District
Margraviate of Moravia